Adscita obscura is a moth of the family Zygaenidae. It is found in Bulgaria, the Republic of Macedonia, Albania and Greece, as well as in Turkey, Iran, Russia, Transcaucasia, Syria, Lebanon, Israel and Egypt.

The larvae possibly feed on Helianthemum species.

Subspecies
Adscita obscura obscura
Adscita obscura balcanica Staudinger 1862

References

Procridinae
Moths described in 1847
Moths of Europe
Moths of Asia